The Komar mass (named after Arthur Komar) of a system is one of several formal concepts of mass that are used in general relativity.  The Komar mass can be defined in any stationary spacetime, which is a spacetime in which all the metric components can be written so that they are independent of time. Alternatively, a stationary spacetime can be defined as a spacetime which possesses a timelike Killing vector field.

The following discussion is an expanded and simplified version of the motivational treatment in (Wald, 1984, pg 288).

Motivation 
Consider the Schwarzschild metric.  Using the Schwarzschild basis, a frame field for the Schwarzschild metric, one can find that the radial acceleration required to hold a test mass stationary at a Schwarzschild coordinate of r is:

Because the metric is static, there is a well-defined meaning to "holding a particle stationary".

Interpreting this acceleration as being due to a "gravitational force", we can then compute the integral of normal acceleration multiplied by area to get a "Gauss law" integral of:

While this approaches a constant as r approaches infinity, it is not a constant independent of r.  We are therefore motivated to introduce a correction factor to make the above integral independent of the radius r of the enclosing shell. For the Schwarzschild metric, this correction factor is just , the "red-shift" or "time dilation" factor at distance r.  One may also view this factor as "correcting" the local force to the "force at infinity", the force that an observer at infinity would need to apply through a string to hold the particle stationary.  (Wald, 1984).

To proceed further, we will write down a line element for a static metric.

where gtt and the quadratic form are functions only of the spatial coordinates x, y, z and are not functions of time.  In spite of our choices of variable names, it should not be assumed that our coordinate system is Cartesian.  The fact that none of the metric coefficients are functions of time makes the metric stationary: the additional fact that there are no "cross terms" involving both time and space components (such as dx dt) make it static.

Because of the simplifying assumption that some of the metric coefficients are zero, some of our results in this motivational treatment will not be as general as they could be.

In curved space-time, we must take the covariant derivative. Thus we compute the acceleration vector as:

where ub is a unit time-like vector such that ub ub = -1.

The component of the acceleration vector normal to the surface is 

 

where Nb is a unit vector normal to the surface.

In a Schwarzschild coordinate system, for example, we find that 

as expected - we have simply re-derived the previous results presented in a frame-field in a coordinate basis.

We define 

 

so that in our Schwarzschild example: 

We can, if we desire, derive the accelerations ab and the adjusted "acceleration at infinity" a infb from a scalar potential Z, though there is not necessarily any particular advantage in doing so. (Wald 1984, pg 158, problem 4)

We will demonstrate that integrating the normal component of the "acceleration at infinity" a inf over a bounding surface will give us a quantity that does not depend on the shape of the enclosing sphere, so that we can calculate the mass enclosed by a sphere by the integral

To make this demonstration, we need to express this surface integral as a volume integral.  In flat space-time, we would use Stokes theorem and integrate  over the volume. In curved space-time, this approach needs to be modified slightly.

Using the formulas for electromagnetism in curved space-time as a guide, we write instead.

where F plays a role similar to the "Faraday tensor", in that  We can then find the value of "gravitational charge", i.e. mass, by evaluating  and integrating it over the volume of our sphere.

An alternate approach would be to use differential forms, but the approach above is computationally more convenient as well as not requiring the reader to understand differential forms.

A  lengthy, but straightforward (with computer algebra) calculation from our assumed line element shows us that

Thus we can write

In any vacuum region of space-time, all components of the Ricci tensor must be zero. This demonstrates that enclosing any amount of vacuum will not change our volume integral.  It also means that our volume integral will be constant for any enclosing surface, as long as we enclose all of the gravitating mass inside our surface. Because Stokes theorem guarantees that our surface integral is equal to the above volume integral, our surface integral will also be independent of the enclosing surface as long as the surface encloses all of the gravitating mass.

By using Einstein's Field Equations

letting u=v and summing, we can show that R = -8πT.

This allows us to rewrite our mass formula as a volume integral of the stress–energy tensor.

where
V is the volume being integrated over;
Tab is the Stress–energy tensor;
ua is a unit time-like vector such that ua ua = -1.

Komar mass as volume integral - general stationary metric 

To make the formula for Komar mass work for a general stationary metric, regardless of the choice of coordinates, it must be modified slightly.  We will present the applicable result from (Wald, 1984 eq 11.2.10) without a formal proof.

where 

V is the volume being integrated over
Tab is the Stress–energy tensor;
ua is a unit time-like vector such that ua ua = -1;
 is a Killing vector, which expresses the time-translation symmetry of any stationary metric.  The Killing vector is normalized so that it has a unit length at infinity, i.e. so that  at infinity.

Note that  replaces  in our motivational result.

If none of the metric coefficients  are functions of time, 

While it is not necessary to choose coordinates for a stationary space-time such that the metric coefficients are independent of time, it is often convenient.

When we chose such coordinates, the time-like Killing vector for our system   becomes a scalar multiple of a unit coordinate-time vector  i.e.  When this is the case, we can rewrite our formula as

K = .

If we chose our spatial coordinates so that we have a locally Minkowskian metric  we know that

With these coordinate choices, we can write our Komar integral as

While we can't choose a coordinate system to make a curved space-time globally Minkowskian, the above formula provides some insight into the meaning of the Komar mass formula.  Essentially, both energy and pressure contribute to the Komar mass.  Furthermore, the contribution of local energy and mass to the system mass is multiplied by the local "red shift" factor

Komar mass as surface integral - general stationary metric 
We also wish to give the general result for expressing the Komar mass as a surface integral.

The formula for the Komar mass in terms of the metric and its Killing vector is (Wald, 1984, pg 289, formula 11.2.9)

The surface integral above is interpreted as the "natural" integral of a two form over a manifold.

As mentioned previously, if none of the metric coefficients  are functions of time,

See also 
 Komar superpotential
 Mass in general relativity

Notes

References 

General relativity
Mass